Frederick John Vine FRS (born 17 June 1939) is an English marine geologist and geophysicist. He made key contributions to the theory of plate tectonics, helping to show that the seafloor spreads from mid-ocean ridges with a symmetrical pattern of magnetic reversals in the basalt rocks on either side.

Early life
Vine was born in Chiswick, London, and educated at Latymer Upper School and St John's College, Cambridge where he studied Natural Sciences (BA, 1962) and marine geophysics (PhD, 1965). He married Susan 'Sue' Vine (née McCall), who worked as a research assistant for Drummond Matthews in the Department of Geodesy and Geophysics, University of Cambridge, contributing to the development of the sea-floor spreading hypothesis associated with Matthews and her husband.

Plate Tectonics

Vine's PhD thesis was on 'Magnetism in the Seafloor' and supervised by Drummond Matthews. Having met Harry Hess he was aware of sea floor spreading, where the ocean bed acts as a 'conveyor belt' moving away from the central ridge. Vine's work, with that of Drummond Matthews and Lawrence Morley of the Geological Survey of Canada, helped put the variations in the magnetic properties of the ocean crust into context in what is now known as the Vine–Matthews–Morley hypothesis. Specifically they supported Dietz's (Nature 1961) idea that sea floor spreading was occurring at mid-ocean ridges. Vine and Matthews showed that basalt created at a mid-ocean ridge records earth's current magnetic field polarity (and strength), thus turning Hess's theoretical 'conveyor belt' into a 'tape recorder'. Furthermore, they showed that magnetic reversals 'frozen' into these rocks, as suggested by Allan Cox (Nature 1963), can be seen as parallel strips as you travel perpendicularly away from the ridge crest.

Academic career

Vine worked with E. M. Moores on the Ophiolite in the Troodos mountains of southern Cyprus. He worked with R. A. Livermore and A. G. Smith on the history of the Earth's magnetic field. He worked on the electrical conductivity of rocks from the lower continental crust with R. G. Ross and P. W. J. Glover, which culminated in 1992 with measurements of the electrical conductivity of graphite-rich amphibolites and granulites at lower crustal temperatures and pressures with a full water saturation and pore fluid pressure and graphite-free

In 1967, Vine became assistant professor of geology and geophysics at Princeton University.  In 1970 he moved to the School of Environmental Sciences at the University of East Anglia, becoming professor there in 1974. He served as dean from 1977 to 1980, and again from 1993 to 1998. After 1998, he was a professorial fellow of the University of East Anglia. and then in 2008 he became an emeritus professor there.

Honours

Vine's honours include:

 Day Medal in 1968
 Bigelow Medal of Woods Hole Oceanographic Institution in 1970 
 Bigsby Medal of the Geological Society of London in 1971
 Chapman Medal of the Royal Astronomical Society (1973)
 Fellowship of the Royal Society in March 1974
 The Chree Medal and Prize of the Institute of Physics (1977)
 Hughes Medal of the Royal Society (1982)
 International Balzan Prize (1981)
 Prestwich Medal of the Geological Society of London in 2007

Publications
 
 
 
 
 
 First edition: 1990, second edition: 1996.

See also
List of geophysicists

References

External links
Faculty page

1939 births
Living people
People educated at Latymer Upper School
Alumni of St John's College, Cambridge
Princeton University faculty
Academics of the University of East Anglia
British geologists
British geophysicists
Fellows of the Royal Society
People from Chiswick
Marine geologists
Tectonicists
Marine geophysicists